In mathematics, a crunode (archaic) or node is a point where a curve intersects itself so that both branches of the curve have distinct tangent lines at the point of intersection. A crunode is also known as an ordinary double point.

For a plane curve, defined as the locus of points , where  is a smooth function of variables  and  ranging over the real numbers, a crunode of the curve is a singularity of the function , where both partial derivatives  and  vanish. Further the Hessian matrix of second derivatives will have both positive and negative eigenvalues.

See also
Singular point of a curve
Acnode
Cusp
Tacnode
Saddle point

References

Curves
Algebraic curves

es:Punto singular de una curva#Crunodos